Böyüktala is a village in the municipality of Hənifə in the Balakan Rayon of Azerbaijan.

References

Populated places in Balakan District